Lukáš Vopelka (born March 2, 1996) is a Czech professional ice hockey player. He is currently a free agent having last played for HC Košice in the Slovak Extraliga.

Vopelka made his Swedish Hockey League regular season debut playing with Örebro HK during the 2013–14 SHL season.

Career statistics

Regular season and playoffs

International

References

External links
 

1996 births
Living people
Czech ice hockey forwards
Örebro HK players
Sportspeople from České Budějovice
HC Slovan Bratislava players
HC Vita Hästen players
HK Dukla Trenčín players
Stadion Hradec Králové players
HC Vítkovice players
Orli Znojmo players
HC Košice players
Czech expatriate ice hockey players in Sweden
Czech expatriate ice hockey players in Slovakia